The 1948 Summer Olympics (also known as the Games of the XIV Olympiad) was an international multi-sport event held from July 29 through August 14, 1948, in London, United Kingdom.

Athletics

Source:

Basketball

Source:

Boxing

Source:

Canoeing

Men's events

Women's events

Source:

Cycling

Source:

Diving

Source:

Equestrian

Source:

Fencing

Men's events

Women's events

Source:

Field hockey

Source:

Football

Source:

Gymnastics

Men's events

Women's events

Source:

Modern pentathlon

Rowing

Sailing

Shooting

Swimming

Men's events

Women's events

Water polo

Weightlifting

Wrestling

Greco-Roman

Freestyle

Multiple medalists

Athletes who won at least two gold medals or three or more medals are listed below.

Source:

See also
1948 Summer Olympics medal table

References

External links

1948 Summer Olympics
1948